Ganga Ram Chaudhary is a Nepalese politician and member of the Nagrik Unmukti Party. He was elected in 2022 from Kailali 3 to the House of Representatives.

References 

Living people
Nagrik Unmukti Party politicians
Nepal MPs 2022–present
1978 births